The Spikers' Turf conference results shows the final rankings of each conference, a men's volleyball league in the Philippines founded in 2015.

Results

See also
 Premier Volleyball League conference results

Notes

Venue
 Filoil Flying V Arena, San Juan
 Ynares Sports Arena, Pasig
 PhilSports Arena, Pasig

External links
 www.spikersturf.com/ - Official website

References

Shakey's V-League
2015 in Philippine sport
Premier Volleyball League (Philippines)